Lupinus michelianus is a species of legume in the family Fabaceae. It is found only in Ecuador. Its natural habitat is subtropical or tropical high-altitude grassland.

References

michelianus
Endemic flora of Ecuador
Data deficient plants
Taxonomy articles created by Polbot